The National Lacrosse League (NLL) is a professional men's indoor lacrosse league in North America. It currently has 15 teams; 5 in Canada and 10 in the United States. Unlike the Canadian box lacrosse leagues which play in the summer, the NLL plays its games in the winter and spring, from December to June.  Each year, the playoff teams battle for the Champion's Cup.  A complete summary of NLL teams' performance is below.

Buffalo Bandits Team Capsule

All Time Record

* Buff McCready only coached the Bandits for the first three games.

Playoff Results

Calgary Roughnecks Team Capsule

All Time Record

Playoff Results

Colorado Mammoth Team Capsule

All Time Record

Playoff Results

Edmonton Rush Team Capsule

All Time Record

Minnesota Swarm Team Capsule

All Time Record

Playoff Results

Philadelphia Wings Team Capsule

All Time Record

Playoff Results

Rochester Knighthawks Team Capsule

All Time record

Playoff Results

* The Knighthawks had the overall top seed in the playoffs, but were unable to host the Championship game due to a scheduling conflict at the Blue Cross Arena..

Toronto Rock Team Capsule

All Time Record

Playoff Results

References

Capsules